Thierry Ebe (born 25 June 1976) is a Swiss footballer who currently plays for FC Bavois. He was voted as the international player of the decade in 2010.

External links
 

1976 births
Living people
Swiss men's footballers
SR Delémont players
Yverdon-Sport FC players
FC Basel players
FC Lausanne-Sport players
Association football midfielders